Graama Panchaayathu is a 1998 Indian Malayalam-language comedy-drama film directed by Ali Akbar and written by Benny P. Nayarambalam, starring Jagadish and Rajan P. Dev in the lead roles. It was a commercial success at the box-office.

Plot

Two persons lifelong friendship takes a sour turn when one of them wins a court case and gets a hefty settlement. After this he considers his friend, who is a barber, to be of lower stature and goes back on his word to marry his daughter to his friend's son whom he now considers to be worthless as he has no job and is a barber's son. How the barber's son tries to woo and marry her despite her fathers resistance.

Cast
 Jagadish as Chakrapani
 Rajan P. Dev as Pappu
 Jagathy Sreekumar as R.A. Japan/Rajappan
 NF Varghese as Gunasekharan
 Kaveri as Sunanda
 Kalpana as Pankajakshi	
 Harishree Ashokan as Swa.Le
 Indrans as Bhaskaran
 Salim Kumar as Bhaskaran
 Zeenath as Santha
 Sagar Shiyas as Bhargavan
 Jayasurya as Bus conductor (junior artist)

In popular culture
Jagathy Sreekumars character R.A. Japan (the stylish name which he would refer himself as), originally Rajappan, a self proclaimed modern barber who was brought by Gunasekharan to destroy his once good friend's barber shop, was immensely popular among the masses.Later it was used similarly in the film ""Njan Prakashan"" Fahad Fazils character P.R Akash , he changes his name from Prakashan to P.R Akash.

References

External links

1998 films
1990s Malayalam-language films